The Fountain Valley School of Colorado is a private, co-educational independent college preparatory school for students in 9th through 12th grades. The school also owns and uses a 40-acre Mountain Campus located near Buena Vista.

FVS is a member of the Association of Boarding Schools, or TABS, and is home to the Gardner Carney Leadership Institute for teaching professionals.

Notable alumni 

John Perry Barlow, digital rights activist, founder of the Electronic Frontier Foundation, and lyricist for The Grateful Dead
Marshall Bell, actor (Total Recall and Outer Banks)
Brad Dourif (HBO's Deadwood and The Lord of the Rings movie trilogy)
Dominique Dunne, actress (Poltergeist)
Griffin Dunne
Lang Fisher, co-creator of Never Have I Ever
Samuel Goldwyn Jr.
Matthew Huxley, son of British author Aldous Huxley 
Jack Lane, director of the Dallas Museum of Art
Steve Lemme, of Broken Lizard Comedy Troop (starring in movies such as Super Troopers, Club Dread, and Beerfest)
Paul Matisse, grandson to Henri Matisse
Belding Scribner, pioneer of kidney dialysis
Ed Sherin, producer of Law & Order
Bob Weir, a member of the Grateful Dead

References

External links 
 

High schools in Colorado Springs, Colorado
Educational institutions established in 1930
Private high schools in Colorado
Preparatory schools in Colorado
1930 establishments in Colorado